Fryup is a hamlet in the North York Moors National Park in North Yorkshire, England. It is within the civil parish of Danby, and is located alongside Great Fryup Beck in Great Fryup Dale.

Fryup is separated into two small valleys or dales: Great Fryup Dale and Little Fryup Dale. The majority of people live in Great Fryup Dale, with Little Fryup having only eight or nine farms and cottages. Great Fryup has no shops nor even a pub; it has a telephone box, a post box, village hall and outdoor centre which used to be the old school. There is also a local cricket pitch and Quoits pitch.

Etymology and local myths
The curious name Fryup probably derives from the Old English reconstruction *Frige-hop: Frige was an Anglo-Saxon goddess equated with the Old Norse Frigg; hop denoted a small valley.

An old woman at Fryup was well known locally for keeping the Mark’s e’en watch (24 April), as she lived alongside a corpse road known as Old Hell Road. The practice involved a village seer holding vigil between 11 pm and 1 am to watch for the wraiths of those who would die in the following 12 months.

In 2014, it was reported that campaign group PETA (People for the Ethical Treatment of Animals) had asked for the hamlet's name to be changed to 'Vegan Fryup' in order to promote World Vegan Day.

Sport 
The Fryup Cricket Club ground and pavilion (built in 1925) is situated a few metres along the track off Long Causeway Road, before you reach the bridge over the Great Fryup Beck. The club senior XI  compete in the Esk Valley Evening League.

References

External links

Where the Leylines led

Villages in North Yorkshire